Minnehaha was a sternwheel-driven steamboat which was built in 1866 on Oswego Lake, then known as Sucker Lake, in Oregon, United States.  Minnehaha was later transferred to the Willamette and Columbia rivers where it operated for the first part of the 1870s.

Construction
John C. Trullinger (b.1828) built the Minnehaha on the eastern or "upper" end of Sucker Lake, near a sawmill owned by the Oswego Milling Company.

Engineering
Minnehaha was driven by a stern-wheel, which was turned by twin steam engines removed from the steam scow Skedaddle, which had been built in 1862 on the Tualatin River.

The size of the engines has been variously reported.

Minnehaha had a locomotive-type boiler 14 feet long, which was described as "nearly new" in September 1871.  The size of the firebox was reported to have been 4.5 feet by 3 feet.

Dimensions

The beam (width) of Minnehaha was  exclusive of the protective timbers along the upper sides of the hull, called the guards.

In 1874, Minnehaha measured out at 103.63 gross tons, which was a measure of volume and not weight.  The official merchant registry number in 1874 was 90084.

Operations

Other steamers on the lake
Minnehaha was the only steamer ever launched upon Sucker Lake.  However, Minnehaha was not the only steam vessel ever to operate on the lake; the others were built on the Tualatin River and transferred to the lake.

The small (20 gross tons) Henrietta operating on the lake in 1870.  The much larger sternwheeler Onward made at least one trip on Sucker Lake, on January 21, 1873, reaching the lake from the Tualatin through a canal which had recently been completed on the west, or "upper" end of the lake.

Sucker Lake service
Minnehaha made its trial trip on October 24, 1866, under Captain Richard Copely.

In October 1866, Minnehaha became part of a transportation route to Washington County, Oregon which sought to avoid the navigation barrier then formed by Willamette Falls.

According to a contemporaneous report, the plan for the route would be that the Senator would run to Oswego, on the Willamette River, where passengers would disembark, and cross over to Sucker Lake, as Lake Oswego was then known, and board Minnehaha.

The lake boat then paddled across the water to the lake’s western end, where it was reported, passengers would be taken to Colfax, on the Tualatin River "by cars".  Once at Colfax, the steamer Yamhill, with Captain Kellogg in charge, would "be in readiness."

The Yamhill would then steam up the Tualatin River, with, it was projected, excursionists, as far as Taylor’s Bridge.  Taylor Bridge was about six miles upriver from Colfax.

While it earned some praise in a newspaper of the time, this route proved to have many problems in practice:

Minnehaha was continuing to run on Sucker Lake on February 11, 1869.

Transfer to Willamette River
It was possible to bring a steamboat down Sucker Creek from Sucker Creek to the Willamette River, if appropriate measures were taken, including the building of a coffer dam in the abandoned mill race.  James D. Miller did this with the Onward.

With the Oswego–Tualatin canal not completed until 1872, a similar procedure would likely have had to have been followed, between February 11, 1869 and early September 1871, to bring Minnehaha to the Willamette River.

Sale at Auction
In September 1871, Minnehaha was sold at auction, either by the sheriff or, more likely, by A.B. Richardson, auctioneer.  The auction was conducted on the Minnehaha itself, at the dock at the foot of Morrison Street in Portland, Oregon.  The purchaser at the auction was Barney Train, of East Portland.

Willamette and Columbia river service
In 1874, Minnehaha was engaged in light towing service on the lower Willamette and Columbia rivers.

Disposition
Minnehaha was dismantled in 1876 at Portland.

Notes

References

Books

Newspaper collections
 

Steamboats of the Willamette River
Ships built in Oregon
Steamboats of Oregon
1866 ships